The Men's Greco-Roman 60 kg is a competition featured at the 2018 European Wrestling Championships, was held in Kaspiysk, Russia on May 1 and May 2.

Medalists

Results 
 Legend
 F — Won by fall

Main bracket

Repechage

References 

 

Men's greco-roman 60 kg